Capet is a surname that may refer to:

 André Capet (1939–2000), French politician
 Laurent Capet (born 1972), French volleyball player
 Lucien Capet (1873– 1928), French violinist, pedagogue and composer
 Marie-Gabrielle Capet (1761–1818), French Neoclassical painter
 Yann Capet (born 1975), French politician

See also 

 House of Capet

Surnames
Surnames of French origin
French-language surnames